Smętowo can mean these places in Poland
Smętowo Graniczne, in Starogard County, Pomeranian Voivodeship
Smętowo Chmieleńskie a village in Kartuzy County, Pomeranian Voivodeship
Smętowo Leśne, a village in Kartuzy County, Pomeranian Voivodeship